Erythroneura infuscata, commonly known as Leafhopper is a species of leafhopper in the family Cicadellidae.

A dark, mostly black species that is distinctive in appearance from most other members of the family Typhlocybinae. The black wings and body have several small pale spots at the base of the wings, down the midlength, and on the scutellum. There is a prominent white patch on the costal margin of each wing, followed by a red mark. The legs and face are whitish. Adults are 2.8-3.0 mm long.

Found in mixed hardwood forest habitat, is attracted at night with a light.

References

Further reading

External links

 

Insects described in 1898
Erythroneurini